Beatriz Taibo (March 10, 1932 – March 2, 2019) was an Argentinian film and TV actor.

Life
Taibo was born in San Telmo in 1932.

In 1942 Taibo began to act at the age of ten on the radio programme La Pandilla Marilyn. She began to get work on the radio, as a host and broadcaster. From her time as an announcer she was left with the nickname "Moth", for because of the adverts she made for moth balls. Taibo would make her film debut in The Millions of Semillita in 1950 if the film had been released. Fittingly she was in a film based on a radio series which told the adventures of the Garcia family who moved.

In the 1960s she made some commercials for Lux soap. Taibo and Antonio Carrizo hosted a program on ratings leader Radio Belgrano, in which the duo became known for announcing advertisements in the form of a dialogue. Taibo, for example, might ask: "Traffic's at a standstill. What do you think happened?" to which Carrizo would answer "A Sunlight girl must have walked by!" 

She appeared in the theatre, notably in the play Boeing-Boeing, which ran for four seasons and whose cast included Ernesto Bianco, Paulette Christian,  Ambar La Fox, Osvaldo Miranda and her friend Nelly Beltrán.

In 1955 she appeared with Tita Merello in Para vestir santos (To Dress Saints), which was directed by Leopoldo Torre Nilsson. She and Yuki Nambá had supporting roles.

In the 1960s she was extending her acting to television, where she appeared in leading soaps such as Inconquistable Viviana Holguera, Adorable Professor Aldao and Juana Rebelde. She notably starred in Jorge Bellizzi and Abel Santa Cruz's Call Me Sparrow, a TV comedy where Taibo played a woman who had to pretend to be a man at work.

Films
 1950: Los millones de Semillita (never released)
 1950: Los Pérez García
 1951: Martín Pescador
 1951: Pocholo, Pichuca y yo
 1953: Asunto terminado
 1953: Las tres claves
 1954: El cartero
 1955: Sinfonía de juventud
 1955: Para vestir santos
 1955: Pobre pero honrado
 1955: El campeón soy yo
 1956: Música, alegría y amor
 1957: Fantoche
 1958: Amor prohibido
 1959: Evangelina
 1959: Gringalet
 1963: Cuando calienta el sol
 1964: Canuto Cañete y los 40 ladrones
 1964: Cuidado con las colas
 1964: Un soltero en apuros
 1966: Escala musical
 1966: La buena vida
 1967: Cuando los hombres hablan de mujeres
 1972: El profesor tirabombas
 1982: Los fierecillos indomables
 1984: Mingo y Aníbal, dos pelotazos en contra
 1988: Atracción peculiar

References

1932 births
2019 deaths
Actresses from Buenos Aires
20th-century Argentine actresses
Argentine film actresses
Argentine stage actresses
Argentine television actresses